James Richard Black (born April 3, 1962) is an American actor and former professional football player.

Early life 
Black was born in Lima, Ohio. He attended Dover High School in Dover, Ohio, where he was a star athlete. He graduated in 1980.

College career
Black played college football for Akron.  He was named the Ohio Valley Conference Offensive Player of the Year as a senior in 1983 after leading the conference in rushing with 1,568 yards. In a November 5, 1983, game against Youngstown State, Black set the Akron school record for rushing yards in a game when he rushed 40 times for 246 yards. In his final college game, on November 19, he set conference and school records for most rushing attempts in a game with 52. He was named an Associated Press honorable mention Division I-AA All-American after the season, and finished his college career as Akron's all-time rushing leader with 3,054 yards.

Professional career
Black signed with the Cleveland Browns as an undrafted free agent on May 5, 1984, after also receiving interest from the Green Bay Packers, New York Giants, and New York Jets. He was waived before the start of the regular season during final roster cuts on August 20, 1984, but was re-signed on November 7, 1984. He played in two games for the Browns in 1984, becoming the first Akron football player to play in the NFL. He was waived by the Browns on November 24, 1984. He re-signed with the Browns after the season, but was waived during training camp on August 5, 1985.

Acting career
Black may be best known for his leading role as Agent Michael Hailey on the UPN science fiction drama The Burning Zone. He has also had roles in numerous other television series and films.  His television appearances include V.I.P., Fashion House, Anger Management, All of Us, Star Trek: Deep Space Nine, Strong Medicine, Tyler Perry's House of Payne, Six Feet Under, Burn Notice and Murder in Mexico: The Bruce Beresford-Redman Story

In motion pictures, he had the leading role of Victor Erickson in the 1998 direct-to-video film Cappuccino, the screenplay of which was based upon a story by author Eric Jerome Dickey.  Black has also appeared in The Replacements, Out of Sight, Love and a Bullet, and Universal Soldier: The Return.  He portrayed boxer Earnie Shavers in the HBO TV movie Don King: Only in America.

Filmography

Film

Television

References

External links 

James Black on TV.com

Further reading

1962 births
Living people
American male film actors
American male television actors
20th-century American male actors
21st-century American male actors
American male voice actors
Sportspeople from Lima, Ohio
American football running backs
Cleveland Browns players
Akron Zips football players
African-American male actors
Male actors from Ohio
20th-century African-American people
21st-century African-American people